Timeline of stellar astronomy

 1200 BC — Chinese star names appear on oracle bones used for divination.
 134 BC — Hipparchus creates the magnitude scale of stellar apparent luminosities
 185 AD — Chinese astronomers become the first to observe a supernova, the SN 185
 964 — Abd al-Rahman al-Sufi (Azophi) writes the Book of Fixed Stars, in which he makes the first recorded observations of the Andromeda Galaxy and the Large Magellanic Cloud, and lists numerous stars with their positions, magnitudes, brightness, and colour, and gives drawings for each constellation
 1000s (decade) — The Persian astronomer, Al-Biruni, describes the Milky Way galaxy as a collection of numerous nebulous stars
 1006 — Ali ibn Ridwan and Chinese astronomers observe the SN 1006, the brightest stellar event ever recorded
 1054 — Chinese and Arab astronomers observe the SN 1054, responsible for the creation of the Crab Nebula, the only nebula whose creation was observed
 1181 — Chinese astronomers observe the SN 1181 supernova
 1580 — Taqi al-Din measures the right ascension of the stars at the Constantinople observatory of Taqi ad-Din using an "observational clock" he invented and which he described as "a mechanical clock with three dials which show the hours, the minutes, and the seconds"
 1596 — David Fabricius notices that Mira's brightness varies
 1672 — Geminiano Montanari notices that Algol's brightness varies
 1686 — Gottfried Kirch notices that Chi Cygni's brightness varies
 1718 — Edmund Halley discovers stellar proper motions by comparing his astrometric measurements with those of the Greeks
 1782 — John Goodricke notices that the brightness variations of Algol are periodic and proposes that it is partially eclipsed by a body moving around it
 1784 — Edward Pigott discovers the first Cepheid variable star
 1838 — Thomas Henderson, Friedrich Struve, and Friedrich Bessel measure stellar parallaxes
 1844 — Friedrich Bessel explains the wobbling motions of Sirius and Procyon by suggesting that these stars have dark companions
 1906 — Arthur Eddington begins his statistical study of stellar motions
 1908 — Henrietta Leavitt discovers the Cepheid period-luminosity relation
 1910 — Ejnar Hertzsprung and Henry Norris Russell study the relation between magnitudes and spectral types of stars
 1924 — Arthur Eddington develops the main sequence mass-luminosity relationship
 1929 — George Gamow proposes hydrogen fusion as the energy source for stars
 1938 — Hans Bethe and Carl von Weizsäcker detail the proton–proton chain and CNO cycle in stars
 1939 — Rupert Wildt realizes the importance of the negative hydrogen ion for stellar opacity
 1952 — Walter Baade distinguishes between Cepheid I and Cepheid II variable stars
 1953 — Fred Hoyle predicts a carbon-12 resonance to allow stellar triple alpha reactions at reasonable stellar interior temperatures
 1961 — Chūshirō Hayashi publishes his work on the Hayashi track of fully convective stars
 1963 — Fred Hoyle and William A. Fowler conceive the idea of supermassive stars
 1964 — Subrahmanyan Chandrasekhar and Richard Feynman develop a general relativistic theory of stellar pulsations and show that supermassive stars are subject to a general relativistic instability
 1967 — Eric Becklin and Gerry Neugebauer discover the Becklin-Neugebauer Object at 10 micrometres
 1977 — (May 25) The Star Wars film is released and became a worldwide phenomenon, boosting interests in stellar systems.
 2012 — (May 2) First visual proof of existence of black-holes. Suvi Gezari's team in Johns Hopkins University, using the Hawaiian telescope Pan-STARRS 1, publish images of a supermassive black hole 2.7 million light-years away swallowing a red giant.

See also

 Timeline of astronomy

References 

Stellar astronomy